Galway Borough was a United Kingdom Parliament constituency in Ireland. It returned one MP from 1801 to 1832, two MPs from 1832 to 1885 and one MP from 1885 to 1918. It was an original constituency represented in Parliament when the Union of Great Britain and Ireland took effect on 1 January 1801.

Boundaries
This constituency was the parliamentary borough of Galway in County Galway.

Members of Parliament

Representation increased to two seats (1832)

Representation reduced to one seat (1885)

1There was no election but the IPP split into two factions, and Pinkerton joined the faction opposing Parnell.

Elections

Elections in the 1830s

 

 
 

 On petition, MacLachlan was unseated in favour of Blake

 

 
 
 

Lynch was appointed as a Master in Chancery, requiring a by-election.

Elections in the 1840s

 

Valentine Blake's death caused a by-election.

Elections in the 1850s

 
  

 
 
 

In July 1857, on petition, O'Flaherty was unseated—as he was guilty, by his agents, of bribery—and a new writ was then issued in February 1859.

Elections in the 1860s

 
  
 

Morris was appointed Solicitor-General for Ireland, requiring a by-election.

 

Morris was appointed Attorney-General for Ireland, requiring a by-election.

Morris resigned after being appointed a judge of the Court of Common Pleas.

Elections in the 1870s

 
 

St Lawrence succeeded to the peerage, becoming Earl of Howth.

 

On petition, O'Donnell was unseated.

Elections in the 1880s

 

O'Connor is also elected for Liverpool Scotland and opts to sit there, prompting a by-election.

Elections in the 1890s

Elections in the 1900s

Morris is elevated to the peerage as Lord Killanin, prompting a by-election.

Lynch is adjudged guilty of high treason, prompting a by-election.

Devlin resigns, causing a by-election.

Elections in the 1910s

Notes

References
The Parliaments of England by Henry Stooks Smith (1st edition published in three volumes 1844–50), 2nd edition edited (in one volume) by F.W.S. Craig (Political Reference Publications 1973)

Politics of Galway (city)
Westminster constituencies in County Galway (historic)
Constituencies of the Parliament of the United Kingdom established in 1801
Constituencies of the Parliament of the United Kingdom disestablished in 1918